Michael Jackson (born 11 October 1969) is a former professional rugby league footballer who played in the 1980s and 1990s.

Career
Jackson started his professional career with Hunslet before being signed by Wakefield Trinity in 1991 for a fee of £60,000.

Jackson was signed by Sheffield Eagles in January 1998. He appeared as a substitute in Sheffield Eagles' 17–8 victory over Wigan Warriors in the 1998 Challenge Cup Final during Super League III at Wembley Stadium, London on Saturday 2 May 1998. Following the club's merger with Huddersfield Giants in 1999, he joined the newly-formed Sheffield Eagles club ahead of the 2000 Northern Ford Premiership season.

International honours
Jackson won caps for Great Britain while at Wakefield Trinity in 1991 against Papua New Guinea, in 1992 against France, Australia (sub), and New Zealand (sub), and while at Halifax in 1993 against New Zealand (2 matches) (sub). He was selected to go on the 1992 Great Britain Lions tour of Australia and New Zealand.

References

1969 births
Living people
English rugby league players
Rugby league locks
Rugby league second-rows
Hunslet R.L.F.C. players
Wakefield Trinity players
Halifax R.L.F.C. players
Sheffield Eagles (1984) players
Great Britain national rugby league team players
Place of birth missing (living people)
Rugby league players from Yorkshire